The National Theatre ( / ;) is a theater in Subotica, Serbia.

Reconstruction
The original building of the theater, which was built in 1854 as the first monumental public building in Subotica, was razed with the purpose of reconstruction by City authorities in 2007, although it was declared a historic monument under state protection in 1983, and in 1991 it was added to the National Register as a monument of an extraordinary cultural value. An international campaign was organized both in Serbia and in Hungary to save the original building. ICOMOS and INTBAU also protested against the decision, but with no avail. According to some opinions, the old town center of Subotica was severely damaged visually by this action. Some scanty remains of the destroyed building will be allegedly incorporated into the new theater.

External links

References

Buildings and structures in Subotica
Theatres in Subotica
Serbian culture
Subotica, National Theatre in Subotica
Theatres completed in 1854
1854 establishments in the Austrian Empire
Cultural Monuments of Great Importance (Serbia)